Apisai Nagata, sometimes misspelled as Apisai Nasata (born date of birth unknown in Nadi) is a Fijian former rugby union footballer, he played as flanker.

Career
Nagata hails from Nawaka, the same village who produced rugby stars, such as Manasa Qoro, Savenaca Aria, Esala Labalaba, the late Sanivalati Laulau, Lalai Driu, Aminiasi Nava, Apisai Naevo and Semisi Naevo.
He was in the 1987 Rugby World Cup roster, where during the pool match against Italy, in Dunedin, on 31 May 1987, he was in the substitute bench as second-choice loosehead flanker, but did not play any match in the tournament. Nagata also played several rugby seasons in Sri Lanka, moving to Colombo Hockey and Football Club in 1986, becoming the first Fijian to play in a Sri Lankan rugby union club, and then, for Kandy Sports Club. Nagata also played for Sri Lanka sevens in the 1991-92 Hong Kong Sevens.

Notes

External links

Fiji 1987 World Cup squad at World Rugby

Fijian rugby union players
Rugby union flankers
Fijian expatriate sportspeople in Sri Lanka
Date of birth unknown
Living people
I-Taukei Fijian people
Year of birth missing (living people)